Northern History is an academic journal of the history of the northern counties of England. It was first published in 1966 under the auspices of the School of History, University of Leeds. It is indexed by Scopus. The journal's founding Editor was G.C.F. Forster and he retired from the journal after the publication of issue 53.2. In 1997, S.J.D. Green (Professor of Modern History at the University of Leeds) joined as co-editor. In 2016, the Editorial team changed to: S.J.D. Green, Julia Barrow FBA (Professor in Medieval Studies) and Stephen Alford (Professor of Early Modern British History). From September 2022, the Editor is Julia Barrow. The journal is currently published by Routledge. 

The journal's purpose is to publish scholarly work on the history of the seven historic Northern counties of England: Cheshire, Cumberland, Durham, Lancashire, Northumberland, Westmorland and Yorkshire. Since it was launched it has always been a refereed journal, attracting articles on Northern subjects from historians in many parts of the world. The journal runs the annual 'Gordon Forster Essay Prize'.

References

External links

Taylor & Francis academic journals
English history journals
Publications established in 1966
Biannual journals
Northern England